In 2020 Kent County Cricket Club were scheduled to compete in Division One of the County Championship, the Royal London One-Day Cup and the 2020 t20 Blast. However, the season was heavily disrupted by the global COVID-19 pandemic, with no county cricket fixtures played until August. For the shortened season, the majority of counties voted on 7 July to play first-class and Twenty20 cricket, with the Royal London One-Day Cup being cancelled. Instead of the County Championship this year, the 18 first-class counties competed for the 2020 Bob Willis Trophy, which consisted of three regional groups of six teams and a final at Lord's.

The season was the fourth in charge for head coach, and former player, Matthew Walker. Former Kent bowler Simon Cook became the new bowling coach after a spell as head coach of the Hong Kong national team, replacing South African Allan Donald who left the county at the end of the previous season. Former England all-rounder Michael Yardy joined Kent as the new batting coach in February 2020. Sam Billings retained the club captaincy that he was first awarded in 2018. Billings and vice-captain Joe Denly both spent time away with England squads throughout the season, and so Daniel Bell-Drummond captained the side on several occasions.

The delayed start of the season and the resulting loss of income meant that, like many other counties, Kent decided to cancel contracts for their overseas signings. New Zealand fast bowler Matt Henry had been due to return for the first part of the season after a highly successful spell with the county in 2018. Meanwhile, Afghan all-rounder Mohammad Nabi had signed to play for the county in the t20 Blast for a second successive year.

Squad
Batsman Alex Blake signed a new white-ball (limited overs) contract with the county in January 2020, becoming the first homegrown player to sign such a deal with Kent.

Departures
Mitchell Claydon left Kent after seven years with the team, to join Sussex at the end of the 2019 season. In July 2020, batsman Sean Dickson departed the club to join Durham, initially on loan for the 2020 season. On 30 July, wicket-keeper Adam Rouse announced his retirement from cricket at the age of 28, after having played four seasons with Kent.

All-rounder Calum Haggett and bowler Ivan Thomas were both released by the club after their contracts expired in October.

Arrivals
In August 2019, Kent announced that they had signed Yorkshire all-rounder Jack Leaning on a three-year contract from October 2019. In September 2019, Kent announced the signings of teenage Afghan-born England Under-19 off-spinner Hamidullah Qadri from Derbyshire on a three-year deal. A few days later, the county also announced the signing of 35 year-old seamer Tim Groenewald from Somerset on a two-year deal from 2020.

Zimbabwean-born 20-year old fast bowler Nathan Gilchrist, who had yet to play a senior match, joined Kent in August, initially on loan from Somerset ahead of signing a three-year contract.

Squad list
 Ages given as of the first day of the 2020 Bob Willis Trophy, 1 August 2020.

Bob Willis Trophy
Matches played in the 2020 Bob Willis Trophy had first-class status, but there were some differences to the playing conditions compared to the County Championship. The minimum number of overs in a day was reduced to 90, the follow-on increased from 150 runs to 200, the new ball was be available after 90 overs instead of 80, and each team's first innings was restricted to a maximum of 120 overs. Kent's first match of the delayed season began on 1 August against Essex at Chelmsford.

South Group

Matches

t20 Blast

South group

Matches

Quarter-final

Statistics

Batting

Source: Cricinfo

Source: CricInfo

Bowling

Source: CricInfo

Source: CricInfo

References

External links
Kent home at ESPN cricinfo
Kent County Cricket Club official site

2020
2020 in English cricket